was a Japanese noble of the Nara period. He was the third son of the founder of the Hokke branch of the Fujiwara, the sangi Fujiwara no Fusasaki.

Life 
Emperor Shōmu recognized Yatsuka's abilities, and through his favor Yatsuka was rapidly promoted. Shōmu specially entrusted him with duties related to the transmission of reports to and requests from the emperor. According to the Shoku Nihongi, Yatsuka was respected as exceptionally intelligent, incurring the jealousy of his cousin Fujiwara no Nakamaro. He is then said to have secluded himself in his home for a time, with his books for company. In 748 he was promoted to sangi, beating his one-year-older brother Nagate to the ranks of the kugyō.

In 756, shortly after the death of Emperor Shōmu, Nagate was promoted directly to chūnagon, overtaking Yatsuka. In 758, he supported Nakamaro's renaming of various government offices in the Chinese style of the Tang dynasty, and in 760 Yatsuka himself was granted the Tang-style name of Matate.

In 766, Matate was promoted to dainagon, replacing  Nagate, who had been promoted to udaijin. Two months later, though, Matate died at the age of 52.

In Matate's day, the ruling power was Nakamaro, putting the Nanke in the predominant position. Moreover, Matate's older brother and head of house Nagate held a position at the daijin level. In the late Nara period, an equality between the clans was considered ideal, and for important positions to be held by father–son or sibling pairs still incurred criticism. For Matate too to be promoted as far as dainagon implies that this due in large part to his own ability. In later years, Matate's descendants included Fujiwara no Michinaga and Fujiwara no Yorimichi, who led the Fujiwara to the peak of their power.

Matate was a magnanimous man, with a talent for assisting emperors in their governance as a politician. Eight of his works are recorded in the Man'yōshū, including seven tanka and one sedoka. Notes in the same work suggest Matate had a personal friendship with Ōtomo no Yakamochi.

Genealogy 
 Father: Fujiwara no Fusasaki (藤原房前, 681-737)
 Mother: Muro no Ōkimi (牟漏女王, ?-746), daughter of Prince Minu (美努王).
 Wife: daughter of Sami no Natemaro (佐味奈氐麻呂)
 Son: Fujiwara no Managa (藤原真永)
 Son: Fujiwara no Nagatsugu (藤原永継)
 daughter of Abe no Obimaro (阿倍帯麻呂)
 3rd son: Fujiwara no Uchimaro (藤原内麻呂, 756-812)

References 

Fujiwara clan
715 births
766 deaths
People of Nara-period Japan
Man'yō poets